Aleksandr Borisovich Savin (born July 1, 1957) is a Russian former volleyball player who competed for the Soviet Union in the 1976 Summer Olympics and in the 1980 Summer Olympics.

Early life and education
He was born in Taganrog. where as a child he moved with his parents in the city of Obninsk, Kaluga Oblast. He studied at the high school №6 Obninsk. The pupil Obninsk volleyball school. Volleyball started in 1967 in Obninsk Youth (2004 - Sports School, which bears the Savin's  name). First coach — Vladimir Pitanov (1946-2016).

Career
In 1976 he was part of the Soviet team which won the silver medal in the Olympic tournament. He played all five matches.

Four years later he won the gold medal with the Soviet team in the 1980 Olympic tournament. He played all six matches.

He was a major part of the Soviet Union men's national volleyball team's success in the late 1970s to early 1980s by winning 1977 FIVB Men's World Cup, 1978 FIVB Men's World Championship, 1980 Moscow Olympic Games, 1981 FIVB Men's World Cup and 1982 FIVB Men's World Championship in row.

Recognition
Awarded Honored Master of Sports of the USSR (1976), Order of Friendship of Peoples (1985), Order of the Badge of Honour (1980).
 
On October 22, 2010,  Savin  was admitted to the Volleyball Hall of Fame (Holyoke, United States).

References

External links
 

1957 births
Living people
Sportspeople from Taganrog
Soviet men's volleyball players
Olympic volleyball players of the Soviet Union
Volleyball players at the 1976 Summer Olympics
Volleyball players at the 1980 Summer Olympics
Olympic gold medalists for the Soviet Union
Olympic silver medalists for the Soviet Union
Olympic medalists in volleyball
Russian men's volleyball players
Medalists at the 1980 Summer Olympics
Medalists at the 1976 Summer Olympics
Honoured Masters of Sport of the USSR
Recipients of the Order of Friendship of Peoples
Competitors at the 1986 Goodwill Games
Goodwill Games medalists in volleyball